Arena Stade Couvert de Liévin (formerly Stade Couvert Régional) is an indoor arena in Liévin, France. The arena is primarily used for indoor athletics with a capacity up to 6,000 people and for concerts.

References

External links
Venue homepage

Indoor arenas in France
Indoor track and field venues
Sports venues in Pas-de-Calais